The Fiji expeditions include:
 First Fiji expedition – an American naval expedition to the islands in 1855
 Second Fiji expedition – an American naval expedition to the island in 1858